El Vendedor de muñecas ("The Seller of Dolls") is a 1955 Mexican film. It was directed by Chano Urueta.

Plot

Roberto (Pedro López Lagar) is dedicated to recruiting young beautiful women for using them in a financial scam. He asks them to pretend that they are married to him but then offers them to rich men, who are willing to pay large amounts of money for these women. Roberto's business runs smoothly until he meets Diana (Silvia Pinal), a young singer who falls in love with him.

Cast

 Eduardo Alcaraz		
 Miguel Córcega		
 Bárbara Gil	
 José María Linares-Rivas		
 Pedro López Lagar		
 Mary López		
 Pilar Pellicer		
 Silvia Pinal		
 Elvira Quintana		
 Raúl Ramírez		
 Jorge Reyes	
 Eliana Silly		
Martha Valdés

External links
 

1955 films
1950s Spanish-language films
Films directed by Chano Urueta
Mexican drama films
1955 drama films
Mexican black-and-white films
1950s Mexican films